Prow Mountain is so named because it was said to resemble the Prow of a ship. It is located in the Vermilion Range in Alberta.

See also
 Mountains of Alberta

References

Prow Mountain
Alberta's Rockies